Analipus is a brown algae genus in the family Ralfsiaceae.

See also
 List of brown algal genera

References

Ralfsiales
Brown algae genera